Guderley–Landau–Stanyukovich problem describes the time evolution of converging shock waves. The problem was discussed by G. Guderley in 1942 and independently by Lev Landau and K. P. Stanyukovich in 1944, where the later authors' analysis was published in 1955.

Mathematical description
Consider a spherically converging shock wave that was initiated by some means at a radial location  and directed towards the center. As the shock wave travels towards the origin, its strength increases since the shock wave compresses lesser and lesser amount of mass as it propagates. The shock wave location  thus varies with time. The self-similar solution to be described corresponds to the region , that is to say, the shock wave has travelled enough to forget about the initial condition.

Since the shock wave in the self-similar region is strong, the pressure behind the wave  is very large in comparison with the pressure ahead of the wave .

At this point, it is worth noting that the analogous problem in which a strong shock wave propagating outwards is known to be described by the Taylor–von Neumann–Sedov blast wave. The description for Taylor–von Neumann–Sedov blast wave utilizes  and the total energy content of the flow to develop a self-similar solution. Since the self-similar region is small in comparison with the initial size of the shock wave region, only a small fraction of the total energy is accumulated in the self-similar region. The problems of these kind are described by the self-similar solution of the second kind.

For convenience, measure the time  such that the converging shock wave reaches the origin at time . The location of shock wave  is assumed to be described by the function 

The reflected shock emerges with the same similarity index. For Taylor–von Neumann–Sedov blast wave, dimensional arguments can be used to obtain 

The shock-wave velocity is given by

According to Rankine–Hugoniot conditions the gas velocity , pressure  and density  immediately behind the strong shock front, for an ideal gas are given by

These will serve as the boundary conditions for the flow behind the shock front.

Self-similar solution
The governing equations are

In place of the pressure , we can use the sound speed  using the relation .

To obtain the self-similar equations, we introduce

Formally the solution has to be found for the range .

The boundary conditions at  can be derived from the observation at the time of collapse , wherein  becomes infinite. This is possible only if 

Substituting the self-similar variables into the governing equations lead to 

As a third equation, we could two of the equations by eliminating the variable . The resultant equations are

The third equation is first-order differential equation for the function  with the boundary condition  pertaining to the condition behind the shock front. Thus  is obtained as an eigenvalue. This eigenvalue can be obtained numerically. 

The condition that determines  can be explained by plotting the integral curve  as shown in the figure as a solid curve. The point  is the initial condition for the differential equation, i.e., . The integral curve must end at the point . In the same figure, the parabola  corresponding to the condition  is also plotted as a dotted curve. It can be easily shown than the point  always lies above this parabola. This means that the integral curve  must intersect the parabola to reach the point . In all the three differential equation, the ratio  appears implying that this ratio vanishes at point  where the integral curve intersects the parabola. This means that the functions  and  cannot have extrema anywhere inside the domain. But at the point ,  can vanish, indicating that the aforementioned functions have extrema. The only way to avoid this situation is to make the ratio  at  finite. That is to say, as  becomes zero, we require  also to be zero in such a manner to obtain . At ,

These values for  may be compared with an approximate formula , derived by Landau and Stanyukovich. In general, the similarity index  is an irrational number.

See also
Taylor–von Neumann–Sedov blast wave
Zeldovich–Taylor flow

References

Flow regimes
Fluid dynamics
Combustion
Lev Landau